Deloffre is a French surname. Notable people with the surname include:

 Adolphe Deloffre (1817–1876), French violinist and conductor
 Jean Deloffre (born 1939), French footballer
 Jules Deloffre (1885–1963), French racing cyclist
 Virginie Deloffre, French author

French-language surnames